The Socialist Party ( in Wales) is a Trotskyist political party in England and Wales. Founded in 1997, it had formerly been Militant, an entryist group in the Labour Party from 1964 to 1991, which became Militant Labour from 1991 until 1997.

History 

The Socialist Party (SP) was formerly the Militant group which practised entryism in the Labour Party around the Militant newspaper. Founded in 1964, the Militant newspaper described itself as the "Marxist voice of Labour and Youth". In the 1980s, Militant supporters Dave Nellist, Pat Wall and Terry Fields were elected to the House of Commons as Labour MPs. In 1982, Liverpool District Labour Party adopted Militant's policies for Liverpool City Council in its battle against cuts in the rate support grant from government, and came into conflict with the Conservative government.

In 1989–1990, Militant led the All-Britain Anti-Poll Tax Federation, which organised a non-payment campaign against the poll tax. Terry Fields was jailed for refusing to pay the poll tax and expelled from the Labour Party for defying the law. The Labour Party had earlier found Militant guilty of operating as an entryist group, contrary to the party's constitution.

In 1991, there was a debate within Militant as to whether to continue working within the Labour Party, centred around whether they could still effectively operate in the party following the expulsions. The poll tax campaign also suggested that there was more to be gained as an open organisation than inside the Labour Party. At a special conference, 93% of delegates voted for the Open Turn. A minority around Ted Grant broke away to form Socialist Appeal in the Labour Party.

Operating as an "open party" was first undertaken in Scotland with Scottish Militant Labour, standing Tommy Sheridan for election from his jail cell. The group became Militant Labour in 1991, after leaving the Labour Party. The journal Militant International Review, founded in 1969, became a monthly publication and was renamed Socialism Today in 1995. In 1997, Militant Labour changed its name to the Socialist Party, and the Militant newspaper was renamed The Socialist.

In 2018, the Socialist Party created a faction in the Committee for a Workers' International (CWI) in opposition to the Irish and other sections. On 21 July 2019, a Special Congress of the Socialist Party passed a motion, by a vote of 173 to 35, which resolved to sponsor the international faction conference taking place from 22 to 25 July in London. As a result, 130 members of the SP left to form Socialist Alternative.

Political views

Minimum wage of £15 an hour 
Obtaining higher wages for workers is a central policy objective of the Socialist Party. In 2014, 17 front-page headlines of The Socialist focused on wages.

On 16 July 2014, The Socialist front-page headline stated "Raise the minimum wage: £10 NOW". The front page quoted the General Secretary of the Bakers, Food and Allied Workers Union, Ronnie Draper, calling for "a minimum wage of £10 now". The call for a £10 an hour minimum wage, the front page explains through a second quote, was inspired by the "historic victory of the $15 minimum wage in Seattle". On 24 September 2014, the front page, carrying the slogan "We need £10 an hour now!", stated: "As a result of a Bakers' Union motion, the Trades Union Congress (TUC) adopted the £10 demand at its recent conference". The Socialist Party now calls for a £15 minimum wage "The Youth Fight for Jobs campaign calls for a £15-an-hour minimum wage across the board, and pay rises in line with inflation, as well as an end to insecure working, the right to full-time work and a ban on zero-hour contracts."

Unemployment and youth 
In 2011, the Socialist Party gave prominent support to the Jarrow March for Jobs, a 330-mile march from Jarrow in South Tyneside to London to highlight youth unemployment, supported by several MPs, eight trade unions and the Daily Mirror newspaper. Kevin Maguire, associate editor of the Daily Mirror, spoke at the Jarrow launch rally, following the Socialist Party's Coventry councillor Dave Nellist, as featured on a number of Socialist Party videos about the event. The Jarrow march featured prominently at the Socialist Party's 'Socialism 2011' weekend event in November 2011, which coincided with the marchers' arrival in London.

Youth Fight for Jobs 
The Socialist Party's first issue of 2010, headlined "Rage Against Unemployment" and written by Youth Fight for Jobs national organiser Sean Figg, who took part in the Jarrow March for Jobs, argues that young people are likely to suffer "permanent psychological scars" from unemployment. Figg calls for the right to a "decent job for all", with a "living wage" of at least £8 an hour, and an end to university fees. Figg demands that the government "bail out young people" as it had the banks, stating that "capitalist politicians" will claim the cost would be "too high".

Socialist Students 
The National Union of Students’ NEC voted "to stand in complete solidarity with workers taking strike action" in the 2014 strike on 3 December in higher and further education as a result of an Emergency Motion passed by NUS NEC, which was moved by Socialist Party and Socialist Students NUS NEC member, Edmund Schluessel.

Environment 
Former Socialist Party councillor Dave Nellist calls climate change "the outcome of a gigantic market failure" citing a United Nations report. He places the blame for climate change on "big business". In an issue of The Socialist headlined "Climate change: 'gigantic market failure, the Socialist Party calls for "green job creation", proposing that unemployed construction workers be employed to build "new and affordable housing, insulating existing properties and installing solar panels". It also suggests retooling the car industry for the production of lower emission vehicles and demands a "massive investment into renewable and sustainable energy sources" with the "profit motive eliminated".

War and terrorism 

The Socialist Party opposes the British government's military interventions around the world, such as the wars in Afghanistan and Iraq, and called for the withdrawal of troops. It opposes both terrorism and also the war on terror. It joined the protests against the Group of Eight (G8) meetings as part of the Committee for a Workers' International.

In the aftermath of the 9/11 attacks on the twin towers of the World Trade Center in New York in September 2001, Peter Taaffe, the Socialist Party's general secretary, writing in the Socialist Party's newspaper The Socialist, states:

Nationalisation 
In December 2009, the Socialist Party demanded what it called "socialist nationalisation" as the only way to save the manufacturing industry. This marks a response by the Socialist Party to the nationalisation of major banks by the Labour Government, beginning with the nationalisation of Northern Rock in February 2008.

In the 'What we stand for' column of The Socialist, its weekly paper, the Socialist Party calls for "a socialist government to take into public ownership the top 150 companies and banks that dominate the British economy, and run them under democratic working-class control and management. Compensation to be paid only on the basis of proven need." The Socialist Party thus defines its "socialist" nationalisation to include at least three distinct features: no compensation except on the basis of proven need; democratic workers' control and management; and that the nationalised industries should be part of a "plan of production".

Banks 
In an end of year statement on the December 2009 Pre-budget, an article under the name of the Socialist Party deputy general secretary, Hannah Sell, indicated the Socialist Party's response to the banking nationalisations. Sell argued that the trade unions should demand "nationalisation of all the major financial institutions", with compensation paid only to small shareholders and depositors on the basis of proven need. However Sell added that this should be just a first step to the "unification of all the banks into one democratically controlled financial system" and called for the introduction of a state monopoly of foreign trade.

On workers' control and management, Sell argues that a nationalised finance sector could be "run by and for the mass of the population". She suggests that this could be done through "majority representation" at all levels. Representatives are to be drawn from workers in the banking unions, "and the wider working class and labour movement", and some also the government.

Internationalism 

The Socialist Party believes that socialism can only be realised on an international basis: 

In accordance with a perceived need for internationalism, the Socialist Party is a member of the refounded Committee for a Workers' International, an organisation of Trotskyist political parties from across the globe. The 'refounded' organisation was a minority split from the Committee for a Workers' International, now named International Socialist Alternative.

Critique of the Soviet Union 
The Socialist Party argues that the Soviet Union was not socialist: "the regimes in the former Soviet Union and Eastern Europe were not genuinely socialist, but a grotesque caricature". Its analysis follows that of Leon Trotsky, who, with Vladimir Lenin and others, led the October 1917 Russian revolution.

The Socialist Party argues that neither Lenin nor Trotsky wished to establish an isolated socialist state. They argue that Lenin, Trotsky and the Bolsheviks defended and advanced the gains of the revolution of February 1917 by carrying through the October revolution. They emphasise Lenin and Trotsky's call on workers in the advanced capitalist countries to carry through the socialist transformation of society. This, they say, would have been a step towards the goal of a world socialist federation and would have seen those countries come to the aid of the economically and industrially underdeveloped Russia. However, this was not successful and the advanced capitalist countries invaded, blockaded and imposed trade sanctions on the young workers' state. The Socialist Party agrees with Trotsky that the isolated Russian revolution inevitably "degenerated" under Stalin into a bureaucratic dictatorship. In this and many other ways, the Socialist Party's policies may therefore be termed orthodox Trotskyism.

Electoral strategy and alliances 
The Socialist Party argues that the Labour Party under the leadership of Tony Blair and since "has deprived the working people in Britain of any kind of political representation" and campaigns for a new mass party of the working class based on the trade unions and the working class movement. It argues that political representatives such as Members of Parliament should only receive the "average workers wage", and its parliamentary candidates would only take the average wage of a skilled worker, if elected, in the same way that Labour MPs who supported Militant (the forerunner of the Socialist Party) – Terry Fields, Dave Nellist and Pat Wall – did in the 1980s. In elections, when not standing as part of an alliance, the Socialist Party fields candidates as Socialist Alternative. The right to stand under the name Socialist Party was won by the Socialist Party of Great Britain, which was founded in 1904.

Socialist Alliance 
In the 1990s, the Socialist Party was one of the founders of the local Socialist Alliance groups, which joined together as a national network in 1999. In 2001, the organisation was transformed from a federal body into a one-member-one-vote political party. The Socialist Party opposed this change in structure, arguing that it allowed the single largest group in the alliance, the SWP, to control it. It could also mean that local Social Alliances affiliated to the national body had, in effect, to expel any members who declined to join the Socialist Alliance party. As a result, the Socialist Party left the alliance late that year. The Socialist Alliance itself was dissolved in 2005, following its merger with Respect.

In February 2005, the Socialist Party announced plans to contest the 2005 parliamentary elections as part of a new electoral alliance called the Socialist Green Unity Coalition (SGUC). Several former components of the Socialist Alliance that did not join Respect also joined the SGUC. Following the local elections in 2007, the Socialist Party had two councillors in St. Michael's in Coventry, and two in Telegraph Hill ward in Lewisham, South London. A member of the party was also elected in Huddersfield but stood under the Save Huddersfield NHS party banner. In the local elections of 2010, however, the party lost one of the two councillors in Coventry and both councillors in Lewisham.

Campaign for a New Workers' Party 
At its annual Socialism event in November 2005, the Socialist Party formally launched the Campaign for a New Workers' Party along with other socialists, left activists and trade unionists with the aim of persuading individuals, campaigners and trade unions to help set up and back a new broad left alternative to New Labour that would fight for working class people. The National Union of Rail, Maritime and Transport Workers (RMT union) held a conference in January 2006 to address what it calls "the crisis in working class representation" in which Socialist Party councillor and Campaign for a New Workers' Party chair Dave Nellist was invited to speak. Most of the speakers were in favour of a broad left alternative to New Labour. The remaining speakers, such as John McDonnell MP, wished it well. The Campaign for a New Workers' Party held a conference on 19 March 2006, which was attended by around 1,000 people, to formally launch the Campaign for a New Workers' Party.

At the 2008 CNWP conference a discussion forum was hosted by the campaign which was addressed by RMT general secretary Bob Crow, PCS Vice-President John McInally, Socialist Party councillor Dave Nellist, Labour left Simeon Andrew and RESPECT representative Rob Hoveman.

No2EU 
In March 2009, the Socialist Party was invited to participate in No to EU – Yes to Democracy (No2EU), a left-wing alter-globalisation coalition by the RMT union leader Bob Crow, for the 2009 European Parliament elections. No2EU received 153,236 votes or 1% of the national vote. This alliance then developed into the Trade Unionist and Socialist Coalition (TUSC).

Trade Unionist and Socialist Coalition 
Supporters of the No2EU electoral challenge entered discussions on a continued electoral alliance, and in January 2010 the formation of TUSC was announced in time to contest the 2010 general election. The Scotsman newspaper named Bob Crow as the coalition's leader. According to The Scotsman, TUSC policies included: "commitment to public ownership of industry, banking and utilities; a promise not to implement cuts in public services; an end to public bail-outs of the banking industry; improved trade union rights; and an end to the wars in Afghanistan and Iraq".

The 38 TUSC candidates who ran in the elections pooled 12,275 votes. The four Socialist Party candidates who still stood under the name Socialist Alternative received an additional 3,298 votes. The party lost its only remaining Councillor, Dave Nellist, in the 2012 elections to Coventry City Council.

In March 2013, Joe Robinson, a Socialist Party member standing as TUSC, won a Maltby Town Council by-election. A second TUSC supporter & Socialist Party member, Shaun Barratt was elected unopposed as a town councillor on 27 March 2014.

On 30 April 2014, the Socialist Party reported that the Trade Unionist and Socialist Coalition (TUSC) "will be fielding 561 candidates in the local elections on 22 May". It termed the TUSC election challenge of the May 2014 council elections "the biggest left of Labour electoral challenge since World War Two". No candidates were elected.

At its annual congress in February 2015, the Socialist Party discussed TUSC's target of standing 100 parliamentary candidates and 1000 council candidates. Achieving this target should secure a TV broadcast.

By the end of February 2015, 95 TUSC parliamentary candidates had been approved by the TUSC steering committee, with more expected, six of which were standing in The Independent newspaper's top 100 marginal constituencies against sitting Labour MPs. On 25 February 2015, the United Left, a broad left caucus within Unite the Union, wrote an open letter to Socialist Party members in Unite appealing for them to withdraw from standing against the Labour Party in marginal constituencies in the 2015 general election. Signed by the Chair and vice chair of the Unite Executive Councils and a number of regional chairs, the letter accused the Socialist Party of having a "derisory" electoral record, gaining coverage in the Morning Star newspaper. In response, the Socialist Party claimed that a Labour government "would be at best austerity-lite and a continuation of the crisis that faces working-class people. This prospect has led to a fracturing of politics." The Socialist Party's reply pointed out that "we are part of the Trade Unionist and Socialist Coalition (TUSC) that also comprises the RMT in an official capacity, representing its 80,000 members, and other leading trade unionists from PCS, Unite, NUT and the POA as well as other socialist organisations and individuals". Asking "why is this letter necessary?" if its efforts were derisory, the Socialist Party nevertheless appealed to the United Left to "enter a dialogue" with TUSC's steering committee about any threatened Labour Party MPs they feel are likely to represent Unite's members interests in parliament.

The final count for TUSC candidates is 135 parliamentary and 619 council.

Transitional demands 
The Socialist Party's demand for nationalisation and its longstanding practice of running in elections has led some critics to label the Socialist Party as reformist, though the party argues that its method is based on Trotsky's Transitional Programme and that this demand would lead to the socialist transformation of society with a "socialist plan of production ... to meet the needs of all" whilst "protecting our environment".

Critics from within the Trotskyist tradition have sometimes argued that the Socialist Party misunderstands Trotsky's Transitional Programme. Since transitional demands are an attempt to link today's struggles with the struggle for socialism, critics argue that Trotsky's transitional demand regarding the need for strike committees should be raised and that the Socialist Party should argue for these strike committees to take control of the workplaces. They argue that this is preferable to arguing for nationalisation since nationalisation does not show how workers would reach workers' control of the workplaces.

The Socialist Party argues that the sections of Trotsky's Transitional Programme which argue for the "expropriation of separate groups of capitalists" and of the "private banks" can be represented as nationalisation as long the demand includes workers' control and management of the nationalised industries. For this reason, the Socialist Party's call for public ownership in the "What We Stand For" column in The Socialist newspaper is followed by the demand for democratic working class control and management as well as "[c]ompensation to be paid on the basis of proven need", as judged by the workers once in control and management of the industry in question.

The Socialist Party criticises what it terms the "lavish" compensation given to the bosses of nationalised industries in the past, and links up the demand for nationalisation to demands for the workers to rely on their own control and management of the nationalised industries, and to the need for the socialist transformation of society itself. It argues that this is a valid modern interpretation of the Transitional Programme's conception.

At the outset of the 'Name change' debate which led to the establishment of the Socialist Party, Taaffe argued in 1995: "To merely repeat statements and formulas, drawn up at one period, but which events have overtaken, is clearly wrong" and that it would be fatal "to put forward abstract formulas as a substitute for concrete demands, clear slogans, which arise from the experiences of the masses themselves". Briefly discussing Trotsky's demands regarding factory committees, Taaffe comments that: "The shop stewards committees embody the very idea of 'factory committees' advocated by Trotsky".

Organisation 
The Socialist Party is a membership based organisation, with branches in localities where it has members. The annual Conference or Congress is the decisive body of the party. Branches send delegates (the number of delegates per branch is proportional to the size of the branch), to regional and national bodies, conferences and decision making annual congresses.

At the annual congresses the national organisers have only a consultative vote, and must win support for new policies. The exit from the Labour Party in 1991, and the change of name of Militant Labour to Socialist Party, are two major debates in which a substantial exchange of views took place in a period of discussion and debate at branch, regional and national level, with a number of documents circulated, before a Congress at which the matter was concluded by a vote. After a conference decision, members are generally expected to abide by the views agreed upon, at least publicly, whilst discussion may continue, or be returned to later, within the party until all concerns are addressed.

Congress elects a National Committee, which in turn elects an Executive Committee of around a dozen or so members which runs the party on a day-to-day basis. Peter Taaffe is general secretary, and Hannah Sell deputy general secretary. I Areas of responsibility for the executive apart from the development of general policy matters are various campaigning roles, such as NHS, workplace and youth campaigns, together with editorial responsibilities for The Socialist, Socialism Today and other issues such as finance raising.

The Socialist Party argues that its method of elections to the National Committee does not promote individuals, but instead is conceived as the selection of a rounded-out team, including both experienced as well as young or less experienced but promising members, together with members from the trade unions and youth and other aspects of the Socialist Party's work. Each geographical region of the Socialist Party is felt to be in need of inclusion. In general, the Executive Committee, after a period of discussion with regional representatives, presents to the National Committee its "slate" or list of members selected from all aspects of work of the party. After any amendments from the National Committee, this list is proposed by the outgoing National Committee to the annual congress.

In general, in presenting the slate to annual congress, the proposed members are listed primarily by region of the country, with an additional list of trade union and youth members, along with other variations from time to time. A session of conference is usually set aside to discuss the slate, with an executive member explaining the reasoning behind the list, and outlining the proposed changes, followed by contributions to the discussion by delegates.

Congress can approve, amend or reject the list, proposing an alternative. From time to time in the history of Militant, the forerunner of the Socialist Party, this list has been amended at conference, although in the view of the Socialist Party, the inclusive approach of the consultation process makes this rare, and has not happened at Socialist Party congresses so far.

The Socialist Party argues that this method is an example of aspects of genuine democratic centralism, where the widest democratic discussion and debate takes place to attempt to reach agreement before any formal meeting takes place, followed by a meeting and a vote, after which, especially in times of serious struggle, the party is expected to pull together in the direction agreed. In a document written by General Secretary Peter Taaffe in 1996 for the Socialist Party's predecessor Militant Labour, Taaffe suggests that the term "democratic centralism" has "[u]nfortunately ... been partially discredited, the concept mangled and distorted by Stalinism in particular. It has come to mean, for uninformed people, something entirely opposite to its original meaning". Taaffe argues that the "right-wing Labour leadership who usually hurl insults against the Marxists on the alleged undemocratic character of 'democratic centralism' themselves actually practice an extreme form of 'bureaucratic centralism', as the experience of the witch-hunt against Militant and others on the left in the Labour Party demonstrated".

Discussing the perceived 'dangers' of democratic centralism, Taaffe has argued that according to Leon Trotsky there are no guarantees in any form of organisation which can guard against malpractice and the form of organisation that a party takes has a material origin that reflects the circumstances it finds itself in as well as how it orientates to them: "The regime of a party does not fall ready made from the sky but is formed gradually in the struggle. A political line predominates over the regime." Taaffe has also written that "Trotsky then makes a fundamental point: 'Only a correct policy can guarantee a healthy party regime.

Trade union influence 
The Socialist Party has a number of members in or recently in leading trade union positions, including USDAW President Amy Murphy, former PCS Assistant General Secretary Chris Baugh, former POA General Secretary Brian Caton, POA Assistant General Secretary Joe Simpson, and UNISON NEC member Roger Bannister.

A number of Socialist Party members have also held key positions in workplaces where disputes have taken place, such as Keith Gibson who was elected to the Lindsey Oil Refinery strike committee and Rob Williams who was trade union convenor at the Linamar car parts plant in Swansea, and is now the party's industrial organizer.

On 16 May 2018, PCS President Janice Godrich announced that with the support of PCS General Secretary Mark Serwotka she would be standing against fellow Socialist Party member Chris Baugh for the role of Assistant General Secretary. The Socialist Party released a statement describing the move as a "divisive step that threatens a split on the left, which can only aid opponents in the union and the Tories and the Blairites outside" and that Serwotka "has attacked Chris without publicly explaining any differences on industrial or political issues". Following this decision, a group in PCS, Socialist View, split from the Socialist Party.

Allegations of violence against women and sexual assault

In March 2013, Socialist Party member and National Union of Rail, Maritime and Transport Workers Assistant General Secretary Steve Hedley was accused of domestic violence by a former partner, Caroline Leneghan. Hedley, who had joined the Socialist Party a year after the alleged event took place, resigned immediately from the Socialist Party when the allegations were made.

A former Socialist Party member, Sara Mayo, alleged in 2013 that the Socialist Party's Executive Committee covered up a sexual assault against her by a fellow member. The Socialist Party did not publicly comment on her case, but Hannah Sell, who was Deputy General Secretary at the time, published a statement on behalf of the Executive Committee: "Combating violence against women: A socialist perspective on fighting women's oppression"

See also

References

External links 
 Socialist Party
 Socialism Today theoretical journal of the Socialist Party
 Committee for a Workers' International
 Trade Unionist and Socialist Coalition
 Catalogue of the Socialist Party archives held at the Modern Records Centre, University of Warwick

 
Militant tendency